William (Will) Edward Arnold-Forster (1886–1951) was an English author, artist, educator, gardener, Labour party politician and retired naval officer. He was married to Katherine "Ka" Laird Cox, a former member of the Bloomsbury group, and associated with Rupert Brooke and the Neo-pagans at Cambridge University. The Arnold-Forsters were instrumental in founding Gordonstoun School in 1934, and Will was the first chairman of the board of governors.

Life 

William ("Will") Edward Arnold-Forster was born into a distinguished military and political family in 1886 as the youngest son of Hugh Oakeley Arnold-Forster, a Liberal Unionist MP and his wife, Mary Story-Maskeline, daughter of Nevil Story Maskelyne. He had three older brothers, Mervyn (Merv), John and Christopher (Kit). He inherited an interest in art from his mother, studying at the Slade School (1905–1908). There, he won several prizes. He moved to Italy in 1911, living near Fiesole in Tuscany until 1914 when he returned to England at the beginning of World War I, joining the Royal Navy and working in the Admiralty, having previously been a naval cadet. Thus, he followed in his father's footsteps and it was at the Admiralty that he met his future wife.

After the war, he married Katharine ("Ka") Laird Cox, who was then working at the Admiralty and moved with her to Zennor on the Cornish coast, near St Ives, where they purchased The Eagle’s Nest. Arnold-Forster was an enthusiastic gardener, and the garden that he created at The Eagle’s Nest was described as spectacular. He also worked on the Memorial Garden at St Ives, and with the sculptor Barbara Hepworth on her garden there. During World War II, Will served in the Home Guard. He died in 1951 at the age of 65.

Family 

Will Arnold-Forster and Ka Cox had one son, Mark Arnold-Forster (1920–1981), an author and journalist. Will and Ka were interested in progressive education, and when Mark was seven, they sent him to boarding school in Switzerland, and two years later to Schule Schloss Salem, a boarding school in Salem, Baden-Württemberg run by Kurt Hahn. With the rise of the Nazi Party in Germany, Hahn a Jew, was imprisoned, but was released with the assistance of the Arnold-Forsters and fled to Scotland in 1933. The Arnold-Forsters with Hahn were then instrumental in the founding of Gordonstoun school, of which Arnold-Foster was the first chairman of the board of directors, where Mark continued his education as one of the first pupils, till 1937.

Ka died suddenly in 1938 at the age of 51, while her husband was in North America on a peace mission. The following year he married his friend Ruth Leigh Mallory (née Turner) (1892–1942), the widow of the mountaineer George Leigh Mallory (1886–1924) at Wandsworth, but she died three years later of cancer.

Work 

On 21 December 1914, Arnold-Forster enlisted in the Royal Naval Volunteer Reserve, joining the Trade Division at the Admiralty where he was involved in planning the naval blockade of Germany. On 29 December 1914, he was promoted to the rank of Lieutenant, and to Lieutenant Commander on 4 June 1916. In 1919 he served on the Paris Peace Conference, and wrote the Royal Navy's history of the blockade. He was demobilised on 19 December 1919.

As a Labour politician, Arnold-Forster was a strong human rights advocate, and became involved in the creation of the League of Nations (1920). He joined the Union of Democratic Control (UDC), a pressure group arguing for more parliamentary control over foreign policy, and against war. In the interwar period he was influential in the foreign policy debates that tried to find an alternative to war, as a member of the All Souls Foreign Affairs Group and as a key member of the Labour Party's Advisory Committee on International Relations (Advisory Committee on International Questions on ACIQ). There, Arnold-Forster, Philip Noel-Baker and Hugh Dalton were considered a "triumvirate". As an Internationalist, he was one of the more vocal supporters of the League within the party, and argued for multilateral disarmament. He lectured at the University of Virginia Institute of Public Affairs in 1938. During World War II he continued to advance ideas for a new international body with more coercive powers. After the war he continued writing and speaking on internationalism and the United Nations.

As an artist, he first joined the St Ives Arts Club in 1909 and was noted for landscapes and pastels. His work is included in the National Portrait Gallery, London.

List of selected publications 

Books
 
 
 
 
 
 
 

 Articles

Notes

References

Bibliography 

Books and theses
 
 
 
 
 
 
  see also Speak for Britain!
 
 
 
 

Websites

 
 
 
 
 
 
 
 
 
 
 
 
 

Alumni of the Slade School of Fine Art
1886 births
1951 deaths
Royal Navy personnel of World War I
Landscape artists